Marie-Josée Jacobs (born 22 January 1950 in Marnach) is a politician from Luxembourg.

Jacobs has been active in the Lëtzebuerger Chrëschtleche Gewerkschaftsbond (LCGB).  In 1984 she became a parliamentarian.  Since 1992 she has served in the Cabinet as Minister of Family, Integration, and Equal Opportunities.  Jacobs is a member of the Christian Social People's Party.

References

Government ministers of Luxembourg
Members of the Chamber of Deputies (Luxembourg)
Members of the Chamber of Deputies (Luxembourg) from Nord
Councillors in Luxembourg City
Christian Social People's Party politicians
1950 births
Living people
People from Munshausen
Women government ministers of Luxembourg
Ministers for Agriculture of Luxembourg
20th-century Luxembourgian women politicians
20th-century Luxembourgian politicians
21st-century Luxembourgian women politicians
21st-century Luxembourgian politicians